Austin Raymond Renfro (November 7, 1929 – August 4, 1997) was an American professional gridiron football player. Renfro attended the University of North Texas and played in 12 NFL seasons from 1952–1963 for the Cleveland Browns. He is the father of former Houston Oilers and Dallas Cowboys wide receiver Mike Renfro. Ray died at the age of 67 and was interred at the Greenwood Memorial Park cemetery along with Lon Evans.

He also served as an NFL assistant coach in the 1960s and 1970s.  In 1965, he coached running backs for the Detroit Lions.  He then coached wide receivers for the Washington Redskins (1966–1967) and Dallas Cowboys (1968–1972).  He helped win Super Bowl VI as the Quarterbacks and Wide Receivers coach for the Dallas Cowboys.

References

External links

 

1929 births
1997 deaths
People from Whitesboro, Texas
American football wide receivers
North Texas Mean Green football players
Cleveland Browns players
Eastern Conference Pro Bowl players